The El Gouna International 2021 is the women's edition of the 2021 El Gouna International, which is a PSA World Tour event part of the 2020–21 PSA World Tour. The event took place in Abu Tig Marina at El Gouna, Egypt from 20 May to 28 May.

Prize money and ranking points
For the 2021 event, the prize money is $181,500. The prize money and points breakdown is as follows:

Seeds

Draw and results

Key
 w/o = Walkover
 r = Retired

Finals

Top half

Section 1

Section 2

Bottom half

Section 3

Section 4

See also
 Men's El Gouna International 2021
 El Gouna International

References

External links
 
 PSA World Tour tournament website

Squash tournaments in Egypt
Women's El Gouna International
Women's El Gouna International
El Gouna International